Citizens for Global Solutions is a grassroot level membership organization in the United States.

History 
Five world federalist organizations merged in 1947 to form the United World Federalists, Inc., later renamed World Federalists-USA. In 1975, the organization turned its focus to educational activities as the World Federalist Association (WFA), while members who wanted to continue political action efforts formed the Campaign for UN Reform (CUNR). The two groups merged as Citizens for Global Solutions (CGS) in 2003.

In 2006, CGS launched a campaign to prevent the confirmation of John Bolton as U.S. ambassador to the UN. Bolton, who had been serving in the role as a recess appointment, withdrew from consideration that December.

References

External links 
Citizens for Global Solutions

World federalist movement member organizations
Globalism
Organizations based in Washington, D.C.